The Black Sea Trade and Development Bank (BSTDB) is an international development finance institution serving the eleven member founding countries of the Black Sea Economic Cooperation, a regional economic organization. It supports economic development and regional cooperation by providing loans, guarantees, and equity for development projects and trade transactions. BSTDB supports both public and private enterprises in member countries and does not attach political conditionality to its financing.

Objectives of the bank include promoting regional trade links, cross country projects, foreign direct investment, supporting activities that contribute to sustainable development, with an emphasis on the generation of employment in the member countries, ensuring that each operation is economically and financially sound. The bank has an authorized capital of EUR 3.45 billion.

BSTDB is governed by the Agreement Establishing the Black Sea Trade and Development Bank, a United Nations registered treaty. The Agreement came into force on January 24, 1997. BSTDB commenced its operational activities in June 1999.

Moody's Investors Service rates BSTDB "A2" long term with stable outlook. Standard & Poor's rating agency assigned BSTDB a long term issuer rating of "A−" with stable outlook. Scope Ratings evaluates BSTDB at A- with negative outlook.

Management 
The Bank is overseen by the Board of Governors, Board of Directors, the President, three Vice Presidents and the Secretary General. The head of the Board of Directors and the chief executive of the Bank is the Director. Board of Directors appoints the Vice Presidents and the Secretary General. In 2018, Dmitry Pankin was appointed the President for the term of four years.

Member states

Although the Black Sea Economic Cooperation organization has thirteen members, membership in the bank only includes the eleven founding members:

Serbia and North Macedonia are full members of the Black Sea Economic Cooperation organization, however they do not have any shareholding percentages in the bank.

Observer organizations
Observer organizations of the Black Sea Trade and Development Bank, include:
 Asian Development Bank
 European Bank for Reconstruction and Development
 European Investment Bank
 International Investment Bank
 International Finance Corporation
 KfW
 Nordic Investment Bank
 Vnesheconombank
 The World Bank

Partnership agreements
 The BSTDB finalized a strategic partnership agreement with the Eurasian Development Bank in February 2018.
 In July 2018, the BSTDB signed a cooperation agreement with the OPEC Fund for International Development.
 In October 2008, the BSTDB finalized a cooperation agreement with the Development Bank of Austria

See also 
 Black Sea Forum for Partnership and Dialogue
 Black Sea trade and economy
 Organization of the Black Sea Economic Cooperation (BSEC)
 International Centre for Black Sea Studies (ICBSS)
 International financial institutions

References

External links

Supranational banks
Organizations based in Thessaloniki
Black Sea organizations
International economic organizations
International banking institutions
International finance institutions
International organizations based in Europe
European integration
Greek companies established in 1997
Banks established in 1997